Locksley is a town in northern Victoria, Australia.  The town is located on the Longwood - Avenel Road (former Hume Highway in the Shire of Strathbogie local government area,  from the state capital, Melbourne).  Locksley and the surrounding area have a population of 110. The town was originally called Burnt Creek and takes its name from Tennyson's Poem 'Locksley Hall'.

History
Locksley was initially part of Henry Kent Hughes' Avenel pastoral station, taken up in the 1830s and early settlement occurred along Burnt Creek and the hills of Teneriffe. A Cobb & Co coach service along the Sydney to Melbourne road was established with a horse changing station at Barlow's Lagoon, about a mile from Locksley. The Locksley railway station opened in 1882 as Burnt Creek, (changing its name the following year as there was another station of that name in Victoria), with sidings serving up to five sawmills, which were supplying fire wood to Melbourne, and a local hall was built in 1887. In the summer of 1901 a large bush fire started near Locksley which resulted in destruction of many properties and in the following autumn and winter, severe soil erosion was caused in many of the creeks. A post office opened on 1 May 1886, and briefly operated from the Railway station from 1910 to 1914, but closed on 29 September 1973. A butter factory operated for a short while but was closed down and finally sold for removal in 1899.

The Locksley School (No 2648) opened in 1884, originally known as Monea North. The school closed for three weeks in 1899 due to a measles epidemic. It also experienced tragedy in 1898, when the 6-year-old son of Mr. J. H. Sharp died following being struck in the head by a makeshift see-saw.

Today 
There are only a few buildings in the town today, with the station and school having closed in the 1970s. Locksley has a CFA rural Fire Brigade. Locksley Bushland Reserve has the southernmost occurrence of the rare plant Brachyscome muelleroides (Mueller Daisy).

References

External links

Towns in Victoria (Australia)
Shire of Strathbogie